Terjola is a district of Georgia, in the region of Imereti. Its main town is Terjola.

Population: 35,563 (2014 census)

Area: 357 km2

Politics 
Terjola Municipal Assembly (Georgian: თერჯოლის საკრებულო, Terjolis Sakrebulo) is a representative body in Terjola Municipality, consisting of 30 members and elected every four years. The last election was held in October 2021.

Gallery

See also 
 List of municipalities in Georgia (country)

References

External links 
 Districts of Georgia, Statoids.com

Municipalities of Imereti